Ebi Dishnica (born 24 February 1997 in Tirana, Albania) is a professional Albanian basketball player. She currently play for Partizani in the First League in Albania. She is the youngest player to ever play in the national basketball Albania women's national basketball team number 12. From 30 July to 9 August 2015, she played for U18 European Championship and scored 12.1 ppg and 8.6 rpg. She is 182 cm (6.0 ft) tall.

References

External files
Profile at eurobasket.com
Photograph of Ebi Dishnica

1997 births
Living people
Basketball players from Tirana
Albanian women's basketball players
Power forwards (basketball)
Centers (basketball)